Sirjan Customs Zone ( – Manţageh-ye Tejārī-ye Sīrjān; also known as Manţageh-ye Vīzheh-ye Tejārī-ye Gomrok-e Sīrjān and Manţageh-ye Vīzheh-ye Tejārī-ye Sīrjān) is a village in Mahmudabad-e Seyyed Rural District, in the Central District of Sirjan County, Kerman Province, Iran. At the 2006 census, its population was 43, in 12 families.

References 

Populated places in Sirjan County